Chettipalayam is a suburb of Coimbatore city in Tamil Nadu, India. The place and its vicinity is also home to Kari Motor Speedway , the LOTUS (Light Of Truth Universal Shrine) and the Coimbatore Golf Club. It is located 17 km away from Coimbatore Junction. There is also a railway station in Podanur nearby. It is a Town Panchayat and not within the Coimbatore Corporation limits.

Demographics
 India census, Chettipalayam had a population of 19,379. Males constitute 52% of the population and females 48%. Chettipalayam has an average literacy rate of 73%, higher than the national average of 59.5%; with male literacy of 80% and female literacy of 65%. 11% of the population is under 6 years of age. At present the Mega Township Project is in progress in Chettipalayam.

Famous Personalities
Swami Satchidananda is from Podanur Chettipalayam before he left on search of spiritual quest, then he went to Sri Lanka. Few years later he went to United States, to find Lotus Shrine in Yogaville, in Buckingham county of Virginia State. Now the house of Swamy Satchidananda at Chettipalayam has become Lotus Temple, a proto type to Lotus Shrine in Virgenia. The place has become one of the top tourist destination in Coimbatore.

Transport
The place has roadways to Coimbatore. The place is connected by Chettipalayam railway station.

Schools near Chettipalayam 
 Government Higher Secondary School
 Sree Sakthi Matriculation School
 Geedee Public School
 Avatar Public School
 Global Pathways School
 Faith model school

References

Suburbs of Coimbatore
Cities and towns in Coimbatore district